Cricket is the most popular game in Pakistan including Jhelum. Main Cricket Stadium or District cricket stadium is named Zamir Jaffri Cricket Stadium where Regional and District level tournaments are held regularly. In October 2008, Pakistan Cricket Board has upraised this stadium for Regional events.

The city also boasts a golf course called the River-View Golf Club, where national golf tournaments are held regularly.

Besides the mainstream sports like cricket, hockey, and squash, a lot of other sports are also played in the rural areas around the city. These, which are equally popular, include tent pegging, volleyball, football, stone-lifting, and Kabaddi thousands of people flock to these local grand sporting events as keenly as the average sports fan anywhere in the world. 

Among all the sports, one of the most thrilling and adventurous is Tent Pegging, played in teams as well as solo. It is one of the most popular equestrian sports. The native Marwari and Kathiawari breeds excel in the sport and many breeders are actively attempting to reintroduce the breed and the sport into the mainstream.

Although there is a difference of opinion as to how and where it started, it is almost certain that tent-pegging is a sport of Asian origin. One source dates it use during the invasion of the Indus region by Alexander the Great in 326 B.C. which lends credence to the belief that the sport originated in the North Western provinces of the subcontinent in what is now Pakistan, This is where Alexander had entered India. The cavalry soldiers of Alexander were believed to have used tent-pegging as a battle tactic against the elephants in the army of the Indian King Porus, who in Jhelum fought bravely against the invaders, lost the battle, but by virtue of his heroic demeanor, charmed Alexander to return Porus his kingdom and make him his friend.

There is also a belief that the sport became popular due to the horse-mounted soldiers charging enemy camps at the crack of dawn removing the pegs which held the tents in place, with the tips of their sharp spears. The Vice President of the Mudgeeraba Troop, Australia Arthur Domain, who is also training his officers for tent pegging explains that tent pegging is actually a sport, "It came about from the Pakistani and Indian armies when they had time on their hands up on the borders; to break the boredom, they invented the sport we now call tent pegging. In the early days they used the wooden pegs that they used to drive in the ground to hold the tents up; and then the other forms of the sport evolved from that. It just gives the riders good hand-eye coordination and makes them better horsemen. 
But most equestrian sports authorities are of the opinion that tent-pegging originated in these areas since ancient times in the battlefields as a tactic used by the horsed cavalry against elephant mounted troops. The soldiers discovered that the best way to make the elephants ineffective was to attack them on their toe nails with sharp spears from the back of a galloping horse. In order to perfect this technique, the cavalry started the practice of tent-pegging which eventually turned into the modern sport.

Regardless of its exact origin, tent-pegging is now a popular equestrian sport in many countries around the world. These days the rider uses either a lance or a sword and charges at a full gallop across the arena and attempts to pick up the wooden/cardboard pegs firmly wedged in the ground. This can be done individually or in a team.

 The breeds most popular and proficient in the sport are the local native horses including the now well publiciesed Marwari horse and Kathiawari breeds.

Ancient vedic texts compiled over the period of early-to-mid 2nd to mid 1st millennium BCE describe the Jhelum area as being part of Kamboja kingdom, dominated by Hun or Gujjar or Gurjara warrior classes excelling at hand-to-hand combat, horsemanship and a mercenary attitude. The war horses of Kamboja were famous in the Mahabharata and prehistory. In the great battle fought on the fields of Kurukshetra, the fastest and powerful horses of the Huns in Kamboja were of greatest service. These horses are renowned since millennia for their bravery and courage in battle, as well as their loyalty to their riders.  
About 20 miles from Jhelum in January 1849 the Battle of Chillianwala against the British took place. The British although superior in numbers and weaponry were thoroughly defeated, It was the main reason why they later established Jhelum as a Garrison town.

When the Moguls ruled northern India in the early 16th century they used Turkoman horses to supplement the breeding of these local Marwari horses. During the late 16th century, the Moghul emperor Akbar, retained a cavalry force of 50,000 strong. It was believed that these local Marwari horses would only leave a battlefield under one of three conditions – victory, death, or carrying a wounded master to safety. The horses were trained to be extremely responsive in battlefield conditions, and were practised in complex riding maneuvers. When the British took over India it was essential that this ability was removed from the natives. Further, they enacted Criminal Tribes Act to prevent the established warriors from training and breeding these horses. They also passed laws preventing the native Gentry and Noblemen land owning rights, removing their ability to maintain or train cavalry. It was only 300 years later, during the First World War, Marwar lancers under Sir Pratap Singh assisted the British.

The horses thrived through centuries of political turmoil, until the arrival of the British decimated the breed in the first half of the 20th century. The British officers denigrated these local breeds as too undersized and hot tempered, importing shiploads of cheap Australian Whalers, thoroughbreds and polo ponies. They reduced the reputation of the Marwari to the point where even the genetically recessive trait of the breeds inward-turning ears were mocked as the "mark of a native horse". In reality the horses were cheap, hardy and extremely responsive in battlefield conditions, they were also well practised in complex riding maneuvers so an underlying threat to the British military.  Consequently, thousands of Marwari were shot, sold off for cheap labor, castrated or indiscriminately cross bred.

Over time, instead of keeping Marwari horses, the local gentry bought expensive thoroughbreds or Australian mounts that were high maintenance and unsuited to battle training or the environment. Having surrendered their very raison d’etre, the regions former kings and nobles lost a fundamental part of their soul and left their heritage and traditions behind. In recent years popularity of Tent Pegging and horse dance has generated revival of the breed and sport in Jhelum as well as further afield in America and the UK. Despite the military refusing to acknowledge or embrace the breeds qualities, A few horses have held out at small local farms with some dedicated trainers and eventers reintroducing the essentially qualities that make this breed proficient in the battlefields and a joy to own and ride.

Besides tent pegging there is the sport of Bull racing or dhand melas. There is an established circuit of these melas that have been held annually for decades. It includes Kantrili Chakmal near Gujerat, Nathuwala, and Jada which is a suburb of Kala Gujran These events usually take place every year from February through to May. They include probably the largest assortment of  prized bulls competing for honour and cash prizes. Not only do they perform their best but they do it in a gloriously stylish way. The grace of a highly trained pair of bulls without any persuasion or prompting from the owners in front of thousands of spectators is matchless ...everything is picture perfect. The keen competitive spirit at these events has been known to generate unlikely rivalries and alliances as the bulls are traded with an alarming increase of monetary values. The sport has had significantly positive impact on animal husbandry as well as regenerating ancient and forgotten farming techniques which given the nature of the land, the people and the environment are vitally important

The tent pegging event and dhand mela photographed for this article was held in Kantrili, a village some few kilometers away from Jhelum, there were around 200 riders and 25 equestrian clubs from all over the Punjab taking part. There are also around 70-100 pairs of bulls going through to the finals and three winners are usually declared. It is a source of immense pride and prestige for the owners of the animals and their handlers.

The events are usually lavishly sponsored by the UK based Pakistani diaspora and thousands of people come every year to see these events which take place over three days. Prizes usually including cash, cattle and motor cycles are given out to the winners.

References